Kpana is a community in Tolon District in the Northern Region of Ghana.

See also
Suburbs of Tolon District

References 

Communities in Ghana
Suburbs of Tolon